Peperomia paradoxa is a species of plant in the family Piperaceae. It is endemic to Ecuador.

References

paradoxa
Endemic flora of Ecuador
Endangered plants
Taxonomy articles created by Polbot
Plants described in 1937